Knuckle Down is the 14th studio album by singer-songwriter Ani DiFranco.  It is the first album where DiFranco has collaborated with a producer; Joe Henry. The record is also her first studio album to feature a string section. It is considered among her most accessible records, and compared to the stark Educated Guess, it is more abundantly produced.

Reception

The album so far has a score of 73 out of 100 from Metacritic based on "generally favorable reviews". Billboard gave the album a favorable review and stated: "The results are a selection of high quality that veers between brightly spirited ("Manhole," "Lag Time") and somber ("Callous")." The New York Times gave it a positive review and said that DiFranco "is still self-sufficient, but an extra pair of producer's ears gives her some new dimensions."

Other reviews are very average or mixed: Mojo gave the album three stars out of five and said it was "More honed and richly-textured than former offerings." Q, however, gave it two stars out of five and called it "Deliberately sparse and bare."

Track listing
"Knuckle Down" – 4:34
"Studying Stones" – 3:53
"Manhole" – 3:45
"Sunday Morning" – 4:49
"Modulation" – 4:31
"Seeing Eye Dog" – 4:02
"Lag Time" – 5:13
"Parameters" – 5:58
"Callous" – 5:46
"Paradigm" – 4:33
"Minerva" – 4:55
"Recoil" – 5:08

Personnel
Ani DiFranco – guitar, vocals
Patrick Warren – piano, sampling, Chamberlin
Todd Sickafoose – string bass; Wurlitzer (track 3)
Jay Bellerose – percussion, drums
Andrew Bird – violin, Glockenspiel, whistling (2, 3, 7, 9, 12)
Tony Scherr – electric guitar (4, 8, 10, 12)
Noe Venable – vocals (2, 3, 10)
Niki Haris – vocals (10)
Julie Wolf – melodica (11)
String section on tracks 2 and 7

Production
Ani DiFranco and Joe Henry – record producer
S. "Husky" Hoskulds – engineer, mixing
Jason Mott – assistant engineer
Greg Calbi – mastering
Ani DiFranco and Brian Grunert – design
Danny Clinch – portrait photography
Eric Frick – photography

Charts

References

External links
 

2005 albums
Ani DiFranco albums
Albums produced by Joe Henry
Righteous Babe Records albums